Narsinghrao Jabarsingh was an Indian politician from the state of the Madhya Pradesh.
He represented Bhind Vidhan Sabha constituency in Madhya Pradesh Legislative Assembly from Indian National Congress by winning General election of 1957.

References 

Year of birth missing
Year of death missing
Madhya Pradesh MLAs 1957–1962
People from Bhind
Indian National Congress politicians from Madhya Pradesh
Madhya Pradesh MLAs 1952–1957
Madhya Pradesh MLAs 1962–1967
Madhya Pradesh MLAs 1967–1972